Anderson Mureta Mutegi (born 1 May 1987) is a Kenyan former athlete who competed as a sprinter.

Mutegi grew up in Chuka and came to sprinting after his capabilities were noticed during high school rugby practice sessions. He was recruited to the University of Texas at El Paso by Olympic sprinter turned college coach Paul Ereng, who managed to secure him a scholarship. He won Conference USA championships across 200 and 400 metres.

A national champion in the 200 metres and 400 metres, Mutegi had international success as a member of Kenya's 4x400 metres relay team, winning gold at the 2011 All-Africa Games and silver at the 2010 Commonwealth Games. He competed at the 2011 World Championships in Daegu and was in an initial squad for the 2012 Summer Olympics.

References

External links
Anderson Mutegi at World Athletics

1987 births
Living people
Kenyan male sprinters
UTEP Miners men's track and field athletes
People from Meru County
Commonwealth Games silver medallists for Kenya
Commonwealth Games medallists in athletics
Medallists at the 2010 Commonwealth Games
Athletes (track and field) at the 2010 Commonwealth Games
African Games gold medalists in athletics (track and field)
African Games gold medalists for Kenya
Athletes (track and field) at the 2011 All-Africa Games
World Athletics Championships athletes for Kenya